This is a list of television shows set in Boston, Massachusetts:



A
 Ally McBeal
 American Gothic

B
 Banacek
 Being Human
 The Best Years
 Between the Lines (short-lived TV series based on 1977 
    movie with same title)
 Boston Common
 Boston Legal
 Boston Med
 Boston Public
 Boston's Finest
 Breaking Boston
 Bunker Hil

C
 Chasing Life
 Cheers
 City on a Hill 
 Costello
 Crossing Jordan
 Curious George (live-action segments)

D
Dawson's Creek (later seasons)

F
 Falling Skies
 FETCH! with Ruff Ruffman
 Flipping Boston
 Friends and Lovers (see Paul Sand in Friends and Lovers)
 Fringe

G
 Goodnight, Beantown

I
 It's All Relative

J
 James at 15

L
 The Law and Harry McGraw
 Leverage (Seasons 2-4)
 Lucky Louie

M
 The McCarthys
 A Million Little Things

P
 Park Street Under
  Paul Sand in Friends and Lovers
 The Practice

R
 The Real World: Boston
 Rizzoli and Isles

S
 Sabrina, the Teenage Witch
 St. Elsewhere
 Save My Life: Boston Trauma
 Southie Rules
 Spenser: For Hire
 The Suite Life of Zack & Cody

T
 Tru Calling
 Two Guys and a Girl
 This Is Family

U
 Unhitched

W
 Wahlburgers
Wayne (TV series)

Z
 ZOOM

 
Lists of films by setting
Lists of television series by setting
 
Films
Television shows